Albert Ward Dwight  (1856–1903) was a 19th-century professional baseball player. He played for the Kansas City Cowboys of the Union Association in 1884.

External links

1856 births
1903 deaths
Major League Baseball catchers
Kansas City Cowboys (UA) players
St. Paul Apostles players
19th-century baseball players
Baseball players from New York (state)